Gomarankadawala Divisional Secretariat is a  Divisional Secretariat  of Trincomalee District, of Eastern Province, Sri Lanka.

Geography

References

 Divisional Secretariats Portal

Divisional Secretariats of Trincomalee District